Krasnaya Zvezda is a rural locality (a village) in Abdrashitovsky Selsoviet, Alsheyevsky District, Bashkortostan, Russia. The population was 56 as of 2010. There are 2 streets.

Geography 
Krasnaya Zvezda is located 28 km east of Rayevsky (the district's administrative centre) by road. Sartbash is the nearest rural locality.

References 

Rural localities in Alsheyevsky District